Margaret Eleanor Theodora Addison  (October 21, 1868 - December 18, 1940) was a Canadian educator and the sixth woman to graduate from Victoria College.

She was the first dean of women at Victoria College, Toronto, and served as dean of Annesley Hall from 1903 until 1931.

Addison graduated from Victoria in 1889 with a BA in modern languages. She was appointed a CBE in 1934.

She taught mathematics and chemistry at the Ontario Ladies’ College in Whitby (1889–1891) before becoming a specialist in French and German at Stratford Collegiate Institute (1892–1900) and Lindsay Collegiate Institute (1901–1903).

The Margaret Addison Scholarship for women pursuing postgraduate studies outside Canada was created to recognize her contributions to women in higher education. In 1959 a residence was opened at Victoria College and named after her – Margaret Addison Hall.

References 

1868 births
1940 deaths
Canadian Commanders of the Order of the British Empire
Canadian educators